The 1988–89 Hellenic Football League season was the 36th in the history of the Hellenic Football League, a football competition in England.

Premier Division

The Premier Division featured 15 clubs which competed in the division last season, along with two new clubs, promoted from Division One:
Kintbury Rangers
Wantage Town

League table

Division One

Division One featured 13 clubs which competed in the division last season, along with two new clubs:
Headington Amateurs, joined from the Oxfordshire Senior League
Wootton Bassett Town, joined from the Wiltshire League

League table

References

External links
 Hellenic Football League

1988-89
8